Robert Fitzgerald Uniacke (1797–1870) was a clergyman and also the fourth son of Richard John Uniacke.

Uniacke lived in Halifax, Nova Scotia. Deciding against a career in his father's law firm, he was ordained into the Church of England, in England.  He served at St. George's Church and is buried in the graveyard of the Little Dutch (Deutsch) Church.

References 

1797 births
1870 deaths
Canadian clergy
History of Halifax, Nova Scotia